Sclerophrys dodsoni, commonly known as Dodson's toad, is a species of toad in the family Bufonidae.
It is found in Djibouti, Egypt, Eritrea, Ethiopia, Somalia, and Sudan.
Its natural habitats are dry savanna, subtropical or tropical dry shrubland, freshwater marshes, intermittent freshwater marshes, inland karsts, caves, and hot deserts.
It is threatened by habitat loss.

References

Sclerophrys
Amphibians described in 1895
Taxonomy articles created by Polbot